Sun Xuelong (born 1 July 1999) is a Chinese footballer currently playing as a midfielder for Chongqing Liangjiang Athletic.

Club career
On 19 September 2020 he would make his debut for Shijiazhuang Ever Bright in a Chinese FA Cup game against Tianjin TEDA F.C. in a 2-0 defeat. On 30 July 2021, Sun transferred to another top tier club in Chongqing Liangjiang Athletic. He made his debut in a league game against his former club on 30 July 2021 in a 1-1 draw where he came on as a substitute for Dong Honglin.

Career statistics

References

External links

1999 births
Living people
Chinese footballers
Association football midfielders
Tianjin Tianhai F.C. players
Cangzhou Mighty Lions F.C. players